Walter Stamm (born 20 June 1941) is an Austrian footballer. He played in seven matches for the Austria national football team from 1965 to 1968.

References

External links
 

1941 births
Living people
Austrian footballers
Austria international footballers
Place of birth missing (living people)
Association footballers not categorized by position